The Carlos Palanca Memorial Awards for Literature winners in 1960 (rank, title of winning entry, name of author).


English division
Short story
First prize: "The Tourists" by Kerima Polotan Tuvera
Second prize: "Faith, Love, Time and Dr. Lazaro" by Gregorio Brillantes
Third prize: "In Caress of Beloved Faces" by Wilfrido D. Nolledo

One-act play
First prize: No Winner
Second prize: The Largest Crocodile in the World" by Adrian Cristobal
Third prize: "Forever Witches" by Estrella D. Alfon

Filipino (Tagalog) division
Short story in Filipino
First prize: "Luntiang Bukid" by Eduardo B. Reyes
Second prize: "Kinagisnang Balon" by Andres Cristobal Cruz
Third prize: "Di Maabot ng Kawalang Malay" by Edgardo M. Reyes

One-act play in Filipino
First prize: "Kamatayan ng mga Simulain" by Rolando Bartolome
Second prize: "Ang mga Kagalang-galang" by Amado V. Hernandez
Third prize: "Mr. Congressman" by Clodualdo Del Mundo

More winners by year

References
 

1960
1960 literary awards